The 2019–20 Miami FC season was the club's first season playing in the National Independent Soccer Association, a newly established third division soccer league in the United States, and first professional season since 2017. It was also Miami's third season of professional play overall.

The team competed in the fall portion of the NISA season, between September and November 2019, before leaving the league and joining the second division USL Championship. During that span Miami went undefeated through eight games and won the NISA East Coast Championship over Stumptown Athletic. Dylan Mares and Miguel González led the team with five goals each.

Overview
Following the cancellation of the 2018 NASL season, Miami FC began play in the National Premier Soccer League, a semi-pro league affiliated to the United States Adult Soccer Association (USASA), and won its national title in both 2018 and 2019. In mid-2019, it was announced that the team would re-join professional soccer in the newly established National Independent Soccer Association (NISA). The 2019 fall NISA schedule was announced on July 25, 2019.

On December 11, former USL Championship club Ottawa Fury FC announced that it had transferred its franchise rights to the Miami FC ownership group, and the club would begin competition in the league beginning with the 2020 season. Miami became the second NISA team to cease league play during an on-going season after Philadelphia Fury went on hiatus after one game earlier in 2019.

Roster 

Appearances and goals are career totals from all-competitions and leagues.

Staff
  Paul Dalglish – Head coach
  Nelson Vargas – Assistant coach
  Anthony Hazelwood – Goalkeeper coach

Transfers

In

Notes
1. 17 of Miami FC's players were already signed to professional contracts prior to joining NISA

Out

Competitions

NISA Fall season (Showcase)

Standings

Results summary

Matches

Playoff

Squad statistics

Appearances and goals 

|-
! colspan="16" style="background:#dcdcdc; text-align:center"| Goalkeepers

|-
! colspan="16" style="background:#dcdcdc; text-align:center"| Defenders

|-
! colspan="16" style="background:#dcdcdc; text-align:center"| Midfielders

|-
! colspan="16" style="background:#dcdcdc; text-align:center"| Forwards

|-
|}

Goal scorers

Disciplinary record

References

External links 

 

American soccer clubs 2019 season
Miami FC seasons
2019 in sports in Florida